Ask Harriet is an American television sitcom created by David Cassidy, Jonathan Prince, and Billy Riback, that ran on Fox for one season from January 4 to March 26, 1998. Cassidy also wrote and performed the theme song.

Synopsis
The premise of the series revolves around a sexist sports journalist named Jack Cody (Anthony Tyler Quinn). After being fired from his job at the Dispatch by his ex-girlfriend Melissa (Lisa Waltz), Jack decides to apply for the job of advice columnist. To hide his true identity, Jack dresses in drag and poses as Sylvia Coco. Jack is rehired and forced to dress as a woman to keep his new job. The series also featured Edward Asner as Mr. Russell, Jamie Renée Smith as Jack's 10-year-old daughter Blair, and Willie Garson as Jack's best friend Ronnie. Julie Benz also appeared in a recurring role.

Ask Harriet premiered as a midseason replacement on Sunday, January 4, 1998, and was then moved to its regular timeslot on Thursdays. Fox did not broadcast any episodes during the February sweeps month.  Back to Back episodes begins in March.

Cast
 Anthony Tyler Quinn as Jack Cody/Sylvia Coco
 Edward Asner as Mr. Russell
 Willie Garson as Ronnie Rendall
 Damien Leake as Marty
 Patrick Y. Malone as Trey Anderson
 Jamie Renée Smith as Blair Cody
 Lisa Waltz as Melissa Peters

Episodes

References

External links
Official Website

1990s American sitcoms
1998 American television series debuts
1998 American television series endings
American LGBT-related sitcoms
1990s American LGBT-related comedy television series
Cross-dressing in television
English-language television shows
Television series about journalism
Fox Broadcasting Company original programming
Television series by Sony Pictures Television
Television shows set in New York City